John Bissett, Lord of Lovat (died 1260) was a Scottish nobleman.

Life
His father John, Lord of the Aird fled to Ireland and then to England, with his uncle Walter Byset, Lord of Aboyne after Walter and John had been complicit in the murder of Padraig, Earl of Atholl after a tournament at Haddington in 1242.

He died without surviving male issue. His lands were divided between his co-heiresses:
Cecilia, married William de Fenton; passing Beaufort into the Fenton family; had issue.
Elizabeth, married Andrew de Bosco; passing Kilravock into the de Bosco family; had issue.
Mary, married David de Graham; passing Lovat into the Graham family; had issue.

See also
 Clan Bissett

References

Bibliography
 Way, George and Squire, Romily. (1994). Collins Scottish Clan & Family Encyclopedia. (Foreword by The Rt Hon. The Earl of Elgin KT, Convenor, The Standing Council of Scottish Chiefs).

John
1260 deaths
13th-century Scottish people
Year of birth unknown